Bombus auricomus is a species of bumblebee known by the common name black and gold bumblebee. It is native to eastern North America, including Ontario and Saskatchewan in Canada and much of the eastern United States, as far west as the Great Plains.

This species creates above-ground nests in grassland and other open habitat types. It feeds at many types of plants, including thistles, prairie clovers, delphiniums, teasels, echinacea, bergamot, penstemons, clovers, and vetches.

This bee was previously thought to be conspecific with the Nevada bumblebee (B. nevadensis), but the two are now considered separate species.

References

Bumblebees
Insects described in 1903
Hymenoptera of North America